Hudson Bay Mountain Resort is a ski area just outside Smithers, British Columbia on the west side of the city, located on the mountain of the same name. The largest of only a few ski areas in northwestern British Columbia, and the only to qualify as a "resort", the ski area does not experience the rain-outs common in more coastal resorts such as Whistler or Mount Washington.

External links
Official website

Ski areas and resorts in British Columbia
Smithers, British Columbia
Bulkley Valley